The Resorts World Manila attack was an attack that took place at the then-Resorts World Manila (now Newport World Resorts) entertainment complex in Newport City, Pasay, Metro Manila, Philippines. Thirty-eight were killed and seventy were injured when a gunman caused a stampede after he set fire to casino tables and slot machine chairs around midnight on June 2, 2017. The gunman moved to a storage area to steal casino chips from the venue, but later committed suicide following a confrontation with the responding police. Nearly all of the attack's deaths and injuries resulted from the initial stampede and smoke inhalation from the fire.

While initial suspicions strongly pointed towards a terrorist attack, with affiliates of the Islamic State of Iraq and the Levant (ISIL) claiming responsibility, representatives of the Philippine National Police consistently maintained that the motive was robbery. Evidence eventually confirmed that the attack was financially motivated, and was committed by Jessie Javier Carlos, a debt-ridden former civil servant.

Attack 

A few minutes after midnight of June 2, 2017, a gunman carrying bottled gasoline and an M4 Bushmaster rifle entered the Resorts World Manila casino's second floor for high rollers. The gunman reportedly wore a mask and did not utter any words or battle cries before opening fire. The gunfire caused mass panic and some guests were injured in a stampede during the evacuation. People hearing the initial shots immediately fled from the first and second floors of the building, but some retreated deeper into the building for cover. Reports of an active shooter in the restaurant below the second-floor casino soon followed the initial gunfire. In the evacuated gambling floor of the casino, the gunman doused the felt linings of poker tables and cushioned slot machine chairs with petrol and ignited them with a hand-held lighter. At 12:18 am, the gunman proceeded to break into a safe room by shooting out the locks of secured doors with his rifle. He then took 113million Philippine pesos worth of gambling chips (worth  million in 2017).

Despite no one being directly injured by the suspect's gunfire, the burning casino furniture produced toxic smoke that caused at least 36 reported deaths from smoke inhalation as fumes overcame the crowd; among them were Elizabeth Panlilio Gonzales, wife of Pampanga Rep. Aurelio Gonzales Jr., Eleuterio Reyes, husband of actress Azenith Briones, and one South Korean man who suffered a fatal heart attack. Southern Police District Director Superintendent Tomas Apolinario stated that all of the bodies were found within the casino area, most of which were women located within the building's bathroom. Fifty-four were initially reported injured, including a security guard who accidentally shot himself in panic; the final injury count was eventually raised to seventy.

By 1:30 am, a SWAT team had responded in a raid of the mall and casino premises. Following a confrontation with one of the SWAT units at a stairwell, shots were fired, the gunman was suspected to be wounded, and the gunman fled upwards to Maxims Hotel, one of the complex's hotels. At 1:46 am, the gunman shot open the door of Room 510 of the hotel, lit a fire at the corridor, and committed suicide by setting himself on fire in Room 510 and shooting himself in the head.

The gunman's bag containing the stolen chips was recovered in a toilet. His rifle, with its serial number filed out, was also recovered alongside a .380 Tanfoglio pistol with an intact serial number (#AA04282).

Investigation

Identification of the perpetrator and motive 

Soon after the incident, the Philippine National Police Director General Ronald dela Rosa issued official statements regarding the attack, describing it as perpetrated by a single shooter, refuting prior eyewitnesses' statements that there were two gunmen and that the motive was to steal chips from the casino area of the resort complex, clearing the casino of all employees and guests with warning shots and setting the casino room ablaze as a distraction or smoke screen. Dela Rosa also confirmed that while no one was injured by gunfire from the suspect, the burning tables and chair stuffing produced poisonous smoke that killed at least 36 people with many others injured by the smoke and stampede. The suspect fled the casino and meandered throughout the complex before isolating himself in a hotel room where, according to Dela Rosa: "He lay down on the bed, covered himself with a thick blanket, apparently poured gasoline on the blanket and burned himself."

The Philippine National Police probed for any possible security lapses that may have allowed the gunman to enter the premises.  Blood samples left behind by the bleeding suspect were collected from a stairwell leading to the Room 510 and an autopsy was conducted to identify the suspect's body, which had been burned beyond recognition. During preliminary investigations, Chief Superintendent Oscar Albayalde stated that the police suspected the lone assailant might have been a tall white adult male who spoke English and likely set the casino tables and furniture on fire as a diversion while he committed the robbery.

On June 3, the authorities released CCTV footage of the incident that extensively depicted the progression of events. The gunman had arrived at the casino in a taxi, whose driver was later interviewed revealing that the gunman hailed for him at San Lazaro and spoke fluent Tagalog, but disputes the allegation that the suspect was shot in the leg during the initial standoff with the SWAT by claiming that the suspect was already limping when he exited the taxi to enter the casino (the suspect was later revealed in an autopsy to not be wounded by gunfire in the leg). The footage shows the initial moment when gunfire prompted shoppers, guests, and gamblers to rush for exits and cover, the gunman dousing flammable poker tables and slot machine chairs with gasoline and igniting them, the robbery itself, the gunfight, and the suspect's retreat to the hotel room. The footage also revealed that the suspect unmasked after hiding at the base of the hotel stairwell, revealing his face as he looked directly at one of the cameras during his flight upstairs. Further investigation of public CCTVs in Manila revealed that the suspect acquired  of gasoline from a local refueling station around 11:19 pm before boarding the taxi to the casino.

Casino management lapse 

The House of Representatives' Committee on Public Order and Safety and the Committee on Games and Amusement opened a probe into the incident on June 7, 2017.

The management of Resorts World Manila admitted that there was a lapse of security in one of the house probes. The casino's CEO, Stephen Reilly said upon reviewing the CCTV footage that some security personnel were not in their posting area when the attacker entered the casino. Resorts World Manila President Kingson Sian said that the management however was able to execute an emergency protocol which led to the evacuation of thousands of people from the establishment. Sian in his presentation points out that there were thirteen fire exits on the second floor of the casino, nine of which are in the gaming area.

Queried about why at least 37 people died despite the casino's efforts. Sian said that the attacker left a bag of bullets in the public area room where people suffocated to death. He said that people may have thought that there were many gunmen and decided to stay put instead of leaving for fear for their lives despite the outside area already burning. Sian also alleged that an explosion of a BMW car on display on the second floor contributed to the panic and says that the Bureau of Fire Protection (BFP) should confirm his claim. The BFP has yet to conduct a fire safety inspection in the area.

The Philippine Amusement and Gaming Corporation (PAGCOR), the licensor of Resorts World Manila, said that it had issued a security advisory to its licensee casinos to provide additional precautionary measures in wake of recent terrorist incidents and the martial law declaration in Mindanao.

Resorts World Manila security chief Armeen Gomez's credentials and educational background were scrutinized by House Majority Leader Rodolfo Fariñas and Antipolo Representative Romeo Acop. Gomez claimed to have ten years of experience as a security practitioner. Gomez also said that he had only "short, stint training" in the early part of his career when asked about his police or military background. He said that he was admitted to the Philippine Military Academy (PMA) but claims to have been discharged due to "personal reasons". Acop questioned his conflicting statements regarding his attendance in the PMA and it was found out that Gomez did not finish college. Fariñas expressed doubt about Gomez's credentials and said that the casino's personnel should have been adequately trained. Gomez was already on his way home but returned to the casino when he was informed about the attack.

Claims of terrorist attack 

The attack, occurring concurrently with the Marawi crisis in Mindanao, targeted an area popular with Western and American tourists, fueling speculation of the attack being affiliated to the Islamic State of Iraq and the Levant-aligned Abu Sayyaf and the Maute group, or its sympathizers. SITE Intelligence Group reported that a Marawi-based Filipino operative linked to ISIL, which had used Telegram to report on the ground in the Marawi crisis, claimed via Telegram that "lone wolf soldiers" connected to the group were responsible. A day later, the Amaq News Agency claimed the attack was carried out by ISIL fighters, while the group's East Asia division referred to only one attacker named Abou al-Kheir al-Arkhebieli and boasted about the number of Christians killed or wounded. Following the identification of the gunman, on June 8, the same Marawi-based Telegram account further claimed that the casino gunman converted to Islam four months earlier and had informed the Marawi group of the planned attack one week before the attack. Since the June 8 Telegram post, no further information and claims from ISIL or its affiliates were publicized regarding the attack.

Since the start of the investigation Dela Rosa has consistently rejected claims of terrorism, stating that the attack may have been a robbery, and refuted eyewitnesses' initial cries that the attack might be linked to any ISIL-related action, which caused panic among many hotel employees and guests. In a follow-up investigation, the Manila police reiterated that they reject claims that multiple attackers were involved, in addition to ruling out terrorism as a motive. Steve Cutler, chairman of the Overseas Security Advisory Council, and former United States FBI attaché to Manila, similarly sided with the suspicion that the incident was a robbery, not an act of terrorism. The June 8 Telegram statement was similarly rejected by both intelligence officials and the Armed Forces of the Philippines in a Rappler investigation.

Suspected link with earlier shooting 

Following the identification of the casino attacker, further investigation was conducted by the Manila police to probe connections between the casino attack and the deaths of Elmer MitraJr. and Alvin Cruzin in Paco, Manila on the night of June 1, two hours before the attack. An informant at the Manila Police District divulged that the suspected murderer is theorized to have been pressured by Mitra and Cruzin, who knew the casino attacker, to repay his debt, fueling the theory that they were murdered by the same casino gunman and the killing was motivated by similar reasons as with the casino attack.

According to the informant, Mitra, age 38, a lawyer and son of former Pasay prosecutor Elmer Mitra Sr., and Cruzin, age 43, a former Manila police officer who retired in 2009 to become a casino financier, were alleged to have met with the suspect at 4 pm on June 1 for coffee, at Maxims Hotel, Resorts World Manila, before the three left to travel in Mitra's dark gray BMW 3 Series. CCTV evidence was also provided of the crash itself, depicting Mitra's car traveling along Paco Park at approximately 10 pm, just as gunshots were heard by passerby before the car crashes and flips over; an occupant emerged from the wreckage and escaped with a limp (corroborating with the taxi driver's account that the casino gunman was already limping before the shooting), leaving Mitra and Cruzin behind, who were later discovered dead from gunshot wounds in the heads from behind. A figure matching the suspect's description was then sighted via another CCTV recording walking to the suspect's house, before emerging from the house at 11 pm in attire and equipment matching those of the casino gunman. Four 9mm casings, six bullets, and a 9mm Tanfoglio semi-automatic pistol (serial #Z04575) were recovered by the police from the crash site, and the suspect's bloody cargo pants matching the description in the crash footage was also found in the suspect's home. On June 22, Senior Inspector Rommel Anicete of the Manila Police District homicide division chief confirmed that the casino gunman is the only person of interest in the twin shooting case following forensic tests on the car wreck.

Perpetrator 

On June 4, the National Capital Region Police Office (NCRPO) identified the lone gunman as Jessie Javier Carlos, 42, a Philippine citizen and former employee of the Department of Finance who resided in Santa Cruz, Manila.

Initially employed as a tax specialist at a One-Stop-Shop Tax, Credit, and Duty Drawback Center, Carlos was dismissed from the Department of Finance in 2012 by the Office of the Ombudsman after the department's Revenue Integrity Protection Service discovered non-declarations/misdeclarations on his statements of assets, liabilities and net worth (SALN). Carlos was accused of failing to disclose that he had disproportionately more wealth in assets than his accumulated salary permitted, including a Manila property worth 1.1 million pesos (US$22,273) and a two-hectare farm in Tanauan, Batangas that he acquired in 2010 for 4million pesos (US$81,000). The court proceedings lasted for years and provided extensive insight into Carlos's further business dealings, including his supposedly dormant gun dealing business, Armset Trading, which existed under his wife's name, and his involvement in the mining business in 2009, when he earned 100,000 pesos (US$2,000) a month as an intermediary during a gold rush in Maragusan, Compostela Valley.

The police investigation revealed that Carlos was an avid gambler, often betting large sums of money, and cited his gambling addiction as the primary reason for his mounting personal problems and eventual motivation to rob a casino. He actively participated in cockfight betting since 2006, and was last active in the scene in Tanauan, where he bred and sold fighting cocks at his farm. To further his gambling ability, he sold his farm in November 2016 for half of the asking price of 10million pesos (US$200,755) alongside some of the fighting cocks he reared. His gambling habits had also led to his separation from his wife and three children and further attempts to sell off private possessions, including his personal vehicle and his home. Carlos had also reportedly owned the M4rifle that he used in the attack, purportedly as a status symbol during his ownership of the fighting cock farm, and unsuccessfully attempted to sell the firearm to the barangay chairman of Darasa in Tanauan for 100,000 pesos (US$2000).

Carlos eventually developed an addiction to gambling at casinos in an attempt to repay his debt from cockfighting, and was known to have been a high roller regular at various casinos (Resorts World Manila was not among the casinos he regularly frequented), until PAGCOR, upon request of next-of-kin, banned him from entering all casinos on April 3, 2017.

At the time of the attack and his death, Carlos had accumulated a debt of 4million pesos (US$79,000) in his bank account, in addition to other non-bank-related debt.

Reactions

Domestic 

Malacañang Palace, through a statement from presidential spokesman Ernesto Abella, expressed its condolences to the families and friends of the victims. Malacañang reiterated the importance of President Rodrigo Duterte's campaign against criminality as a "centerpiece program" of the administration. President Duterte called the gunman "crazy", ruling out any links to ISIL saying the group was more "brutal and cruel". While speaking to reporters in Subic Bay, Duterte apologized for the incident and questioned Resorts World Manila on the layout of their emergency exits. He also denied that the incident was terrorism-related, but warned that a terrorist incident could occur in the Philippines.

Members of the Philippine Congress expressed sadness over the attack. Muntinlupa Representative Ruffy Biazon and Senator Joel Villanueva urged the public to remain calm to avoid spreading fear and escalating the incident into an issue of national security. Magdalo Representative Gary Alejano labeled the incident as "isolated". Speaker of the Philippine House of Representatives Pantaleon Alvarez disagreed with the conclusions of police, who ruled out terrorism in the investigation, and hinted at the possibility of the attack being a "lone wolf terrorist attack"; Alvarez called on the police and the military to cooperate closely in ensuring public safety against terrorism. Gabriela Women's Party Representative Emmi de Jesus expressed hope that the incident would not prompt the extension and expansion of martial law, which had already been declared in Mindanao following the Marawi crisis. Senators Win Gatchalian and Grace Poe urged establishments, particularly tourism facilities, to tighten security. Senator Panfilo Lacson, a former director-general of the Philippine National Police, urged the police to prevent speculation from interfering in their investigation. Senate President Aquilino Pimentel III raised questions to the management and PAGCOR regarding the security arrangements and concern for safety in casino hotels, while Senator Francis Pangilinan also raised similar questions.

The National Economic and Development Authority assured that the fundamentals of the Philippine economy would not change due to the incident, which director-general Ernesto Pernia described as an "isolated criminal case of robbery."

Several local celebrities offered their prayers to the victims of the attack.

In response to the attack, the police have increased its presence in shopping malls in Metro Manila.

Manila airport closure 

From 1:45 to 3:45 am (UTC+8) during the attack, the main gates of the four terminals of the nearby Ninoy Aquino International Airport were shut down as a precaution. Only passengers and airport personnel already inside were able to move between terminals during the shutdown. Four Philippine Airlines flights were delayed. Operations of the airport normalized the following day but security measures were heightened. The issuance of access passes to passengers was temporarily suspended. Cebu Pacific offered refunds or free rebooking to patrons who booked flights scheduled on June 2, 2017.

Responses to the gambling industry 

PAGCOR suspended the operating license of Resorts World Manila on June 9, 2017, until it deems that it has rectified its "serious security lapses and deficiencies" saying that the incident put the gaming, tourism, and hospitality industries of the Philippines "in a bad light". PAGCOR has also said that it will require its other casino and resort licensees to submit their security protocols as part of measures to prevent a similar incident from occurring.

On the same day, the Philippine National Police ordered the relief of security guards posted at the entrance and exits of the Resorts World Manila casino.

International
The European Union expressed sympathy to the Philippine government and the attack victims' family and friends, as well as hope for the speedy recovery of the injured. United States President Donald Trump expressed sadness over the incident, which he labeled as a terrorist attack, and added that U.S. officials "were closely monitoring the situation." U.S. Congresswoman Madeleine Bordallo from Guam condemned the attack and offered assistance to constituents on Guam attempting to contact family members at the resort. The embassies of Australia, the United Kingdom, and the United States issued travel advisories to their citizens, informing them to avoid the area and to follow the advice of local authorities.

Travellers International Hotel Group, the operator of Resorts World Manila, condemned the attack as a "cowardly act of a deranged mind."

Aftermath 

The license suspension imposed by PAGCOR was lifted on June 29, 2017, and on the same day, Resort World Manila resumed its gambling operations in gaming areas not affected by the attack.

The casino resort experienced a decline in revenue, causing management to rush "Phase3" of the facility's development. It hired Blackpanda, a private security consultant, to tighten its security procedures. The gambling area on the second floor affected by the attack will be converted to be part of the shopping mall. By September 2017 the casino had recovered most of its visitorship, accommodating 26,000 people per day on average compared to 28,000 before the attack.

References

2017 murders in the Philippines
2017 disasters in the Philippines
2017 fires in Asia
Resorts World attack
Arson in the Philippines
Attacks in Asia in 2017
Attacks on hotels in Asia
Crime in Metro Manila
Fires in the Philippines
Hotel fires
June 2017 crimes in Asia
Mass murder in 2017
Murder–suicides in Asia
Robberies in the Philippines
Resorts World Manila attack
History of Metro Manila
Attacks in the Philippines